is a Japanese former professional baseball player, and the current manager of the Yomiuri Giants baseball team in Nippon Professional Baseball.

Career
He won the Central League Rookie of the Year award in 1981 and the Central League MVP in 1983. A hugely popular member of the Giants, during his playing career he was frequently the subject of newspaper, magazines, and television profiles.

Hara previously managed the Giants from 2002 to 2003, and again from 2006 until his abrupt resignation at the end of the 2015 season. During those tenures, he led the Giants to seven Central League pennants and three Japan Series championships. In October 2018, he was rehired as Giants manager for three seasons after Yoshinobu Takahashi announced his intention to step down.

Hara led the Japan national baseball team to victory in the final of the 2009 World Baseball Classic.
He manager total 1104 won, 823 defeated, include Japan Series (2002 2009 and 2013 take title) and climax series on total won 57.2 percent total 16 years as April 2, 2022.

As result for player era

Sourse:Nippon Professional Baseball

As result for team manager era

(Source: Nippon Professional Baseball)
Note 1: A regular season Central League champion, however, playoff (Climax Series) failed for second round in 2007.
Note 2: A regular season Central League champion, however, Climax Series failed for second round in 2014.

Personal life
Hara's nephew, Tomoyuki Sugano, is a professional pitcher for the Giants.

References

External links 

 

1958 births
Living people
Japanese Baseball Hall of Fame inductees
Japanese baseball players
Managers of baseball teams in Japan
Nippon Professional Baseball infielders
Nippon Professional Baseball MVP Award winners
Nippon Professional Baseball Rookie of the Year Award winners
People from Sagamihara
Yomiuri Giants players
Yomiuri Giants managers
World Baseball Classic managers